Pattabhi is an Indian name.

 Bhogaraju Pattabhi Sitaramayya, an Indian independence activist and political leader in the state of Andhra Pradesh
 K. Pattabhi Jois, an Indian yoga teacher
 Pattabhi Rama Reddy Tikkavarapu, an Indian writer, film producer and director.

Pattabhi is an Indian Hindu name.